Isabel Hardman, Lady Walney (born 5 May 1986), is an English political journalist and the assistant editor of The Spectator. In 2015, she was named Journalist of the Year at the Political Studies Association's annual awards.

Early life
Born in Camden, Hardman is the daughter of Michael Hardman, the first chairman and one of the four founders of the Campaign for Real Ale. She attended St Catherine's School, Bramley, and Godalming College, before graduating from the University of Exeter with a first-class degree in English literature in 2007. While at university, Hardman worked as a freelance journalist for The Observer. She completed a National Council for the Training of Journalists course at Highbury College in 2009.

Career
Hardman began her career in journalism as a senior reporter for Inside Housing magazine. She then became assistant news editor at PoliticsHome, moving to The Spectator in 2012. In September 2014, GQ magazine named her as one of their 100 most connected women in Britain, and in December 2015, she was named "Journalist of the Year" at the Political Studies Association's annual awards. She is currently the assistant editor of The Spectator. She appears on television programmes such as Question Time, The Andrew Marr Show and Have I Got News for You, and is a presenter of the BBC Radio 4 programme Week in Westminster. She hosts The Spectator Podcast. She also writes a monthly column for the i paper on health policy and a weekly column for the Evening Standard on nature in London.

Personal life
In April 2016, Hardman tweeted that a male member of Parliament had referred to her as "the totty" and that she had reported him to the whips. She was not intending to name the man who was subsequently revealed to be the Conservative MP Bob Stewart.

Hardman has written about suffering from depression, and in October 2016 wrote that she had stopped working temporarily due to anxiety and depression. She has  said that, in 2017, she was diagnosed with post-traumatic stress disorder, due to a serious trauma in her personal life. She wrote that her recovery was partly down to time spent outdoors: she is a cold-water swimmer, and in 2019 ran the London Marathon for Refuge, raising £37,000 for the charity.

Hardman began a relationship with the politician John Woodcock in summer 2016. In November 2019, Woodcock announced he and Hardman were expecting a child. Hardman gave birth to a son on 12 May 2020. On 30 July 2021, the couple married in a small ceremony at Barrow-in-Furness's registry office. This gave Hardman the title Lady Walney as the wife of a baron.

Bibliography 

 Hardman, Isabel (2018), Why We Get the Wrong Politicians, Atlantic Books, London, UK 
 Hardman, Isabel (2020), The Natural Health Service, Atlantic Books, London, UK

References

External links
Isabel Hardman talking about her career

Living people
Alumni of the University of Exeter
English political journalists
People educated at St Catherine's School, Bramley
People from the London Borough of Camden
The Spectator people
Spouses of life peers
1986 births